Rara is a Chilean film directed by Pepa San Martín, written by Alicia Scherson, and starring Julia Lübbert and Mariana Loyola. It is the first feature film produced by Manufactura de Películas, based in Santiago, and co-produced by Le Tiro Cine, from Buenos Aires.

Rara won the Jury Prize at the Berlin Film Festival in 2016, and received an Horizontes Latinos Award at the 64th edition of the San Sebastian Film Festival in 2016.

Plot
Sara, a 13-year-old girl, faces challenges with school, boys, hiding a secret from her best friend, and her parents quarreling. She has no problems with her mother living with another woman, even if her father does not agree.

Cast
 Julia Lübbert as Sara
 Emilia Ossandón as Catalina
 Mariana Loyola as Paula
 Agustina Muñoz as Lía
 Daniel Muñoz as Víctor
 Sigrid Alegría as Nicole
 Coca Guazzini as Icha
 Enrique Bustamante as school counselor
 Luz Croxatto as Eugenia
 Claudia Celedón as Ximena
 Micaela Cristi as Pancha
 Nicolás Vigneaux as Julián

Awards

References

External links
 

2016 films
Argentine comedy films
Argentine LGBT-related films
Chilean comedy films
Chilean LGBT-related films
2010s Spanish-language films
2016 LGBT-related films
Chilean coming-of-age films
Argentine coming-of-age films
LGBT-related comedy films
LGBT-related coming-of-age films
2010s Argentine films
2010s Chilean films